Metric or metrical may refer to:
 Metric system, an internationally adopted decimal system of measurement
 An adjective indicating relation to measurement in general, or a noun describing a specific type of measurement

Mathematics 

In mathematics, metric may refer to one of two related, but distinct concepts:
 A function which measures distance between two points in a metric space
 A metric tensor, in differential geometry, which allows defining lengths of curves, angles, and distances in a manifold

Natural sciences 
 Metric tensor (general relativity), the fundamental object of study in general relativity, similar to the gravitational field in Newtonian physics
 Senses related to measurement:
 Metric system, an internationally adopted decimal system of measurement
 Metric units, units related to a metric system
 International System of Units, or Système International (SI), the most widely used metric system
 METRIC, a model that uses Landsat satellite data to compute and map evapotranspiration (ET) in climatology/meteorology

Engineering and business 
The word metric is often used to mean a descriptive statistic, indicator, or figure of merit used to describe or measure something quantitatively, including:
 Performance indicator, a measure of an organization's activities and performance
 Metrics (networking), the properties of a communication path used by a router to make routing decisions
 Software metric, a measure of some property of a piece of software or its specifications
 Reuse metrics, a quantitative indicator of an attribute for software reuse and reusability
 Search engine optimization metrics, indicators of a website's organic search potential

Music 
 Alex Metric (born 1984), British musician, DJ and producer
 Metric (band), a Canadian rock band founded in Toronto, Ontario

Other uses 
 Metre (poetry), the rhythmic structure of poetry
 Font metrics, properties describing the overall shape of a font

See also
 Meter (disambiguation)
 Metrecal, a diet drink introduced in the 1960s
 Metric conversion (disambiguation)
 Metric dimension (disambiguation)
 Metric gauge (disambiguation)